David Richard Hudson (born December 28, 1949) is a Canadian former professional ice hockey player who played 409 games in the National Hockey League in the 1970s, with the New York Islanders, Kansas City Scouts, and Colorado Rockies. Hudson played for the University of North Dakota before turning professional in 1970. Selected by the Chicago Black Hawks in the 1969 NHL Amateur Draft, he spent two years in their system before being claimed by the expansion Islanders, making his NHL debut with them in 1972. Hudson took the opening faceoff during the first-ever game in Islanders history. 

"Hud" was again selected by an expansion team, the Scouts in 1974, playing in Kansas City for two years, and a further two when the team relocated to Colorado, retiring in 1978. In his career, Hudson scored 59 goals, 124 assists, and 183 points. Hudson was the last Islander to wear number 5 before Denis Potvin.

Following his professional hockey career, Hudson settled in Texas, eventually founding his own commercial printing business, Colormark.

Career statistics

Regular season and playoffs

References

External links 
 

1949 births
Living people
Canadian ice hockey centres
Chicago Blackhawks draft picks
Colorado Rockies (NHL) players
Dallas Black Hawks players
Fort Worth Wings players
Kansas City Scouts players
New York Islanders players
North Dakota Fighting Hawks men's ice hockey players
People from St. Thomas, Ontario
Rhode Island Reds players